Pumiri is a  volcano in the Andes that rises  above the surrounding terrain. The volcano is located in the Oruro Department, Sabaya Province, northwest of the Salar de Coipasa.

The volcano is formed from two volcanic cones. The younger of which may be of Holocene age and is constructed in the middle of a caldera marked by a semilunar shape. Thanks to heavy erosion, lavas and eruption products are mostly found in peripheral parts of the edifice, while in the central area a deep-grounded crystalline core is exposed. The volcano forms a lineament with Saxani and Isluga.

The creeks named Qhamiña (Camiña) and on the western side Waywasi (Guayhuase) originate on the volcano. Sulfur deposits on the volcano were exploited by indigenous people.

References

Volcanoes of Oruro Department
Extinct volcanoes
Four-thousanders of the Andes